Novoaltybayevo (Yañı Altıbay) is a rural locality (a village) in Chelkakovsky Selsoviet, Burayevsky District, Bashkortostan, Russia. The population was 66 as of 2010. There is 1 street.

Geography 
Novoaltybayevo is located 29 km southwest of Burayevo (the district's administrative centre) by road. Tugaryakovo is the nearest rural locality.

References 

Rural localities in Burayevsky District